Edgar Chahine (: 31 October 1874, in Vienna – 18 March 1947, in Paris) was a French painter, engraver, and illustrator of Armenian descent.

Biography 
Edgar Chahine was born in Vienna but moved to Constantinople at a very young age. There he began his studies under the financial support of his father who was the director of the Ottoman Bank. His artistic abilities were soon noticed by his professor, Melkon Tiratzuyan, who advised him to pursue his studies in Italy in order to participate in a more active artistic environment. He then moved to Venice, where he attended the prestigious Armenian Lyceum Moorat Raphael. He studied under Antonio Ermolao Paoletti at the renowned Academia di Belle Arti. After gaining much experience in Italy, he then moved to Paris in 1895. He enrolled at the Académie Julian, and had successful exhibitions at the Society of French Artists. His first painting which was exhibited at the Paris Salon “Société des artistes français ” in 1896, was a portrait of a beggar. He continued to have exhibitions from 1896 to 1899. In these exhibitions, Chahine included his art series called "Lamentable Life" which features the tables of poor people. In 1900, his prints earned him a gold medal at the Universal Exhibition in Paris. In 1903, he won another gold medal at the Venice Biennale. Chahine often turned to Armenian themes and in 1926 was a founding member of “Ani”, the Union of French-Armenian Artists of Paris. He became a naturalized French citizen in 1925 and was awarded the Légion d'Honneur in 1932. Many of Chahine's prints were lost in a fire in his atelier in 1926, and many more were destroyed in a flood in 1942.

Legacy 
In 1928 a museum in Crouttes–Vimoutiers in the Orne region of France was named after him, Musée Chahine.

References

 Benoît Noël, préface de Wanda Polat, Edgar Chahine peintre-graveur 1874–1947, Ste Marguerite des Loges, Éditions BVR, 2008
 Uhla Ehrendväld et al., Catalogue de l'exposition Chahine – Paris, Paris, Musée Carnavalet, 1982.
 Charles Pérusseaux et al., Catalogue de l'exposition Edgar Chahine – peintre-graveur, Paris, Bibliothèque Nationale, 1980.
 Marcello et Rosalba Tabanelli, Catalogue de l'œuvre gravé d'Edgar Chahine, Milan, Il mercante di stampe editore, 1975.
 Claude Blaizot et Jean Edouard Gautrot, Chahine Illustrateur – Catalogue raisonné et illustré, Paris, Librairie Auguste Blaizot, 1974.

External links
 Biography by Bernard Derroitte
 Armstrong Fine Art: overview of works by Edgar Chahine

Artists from Vienna
Austrian people of Armenian descent
19th-century French painters
French male painters
20th-century French painters
20th-century French male artists
Ethnic Armenian painters
Armenian illustrators
Académie Julian alumni
Academic staff of the Académie Julian
École des Beaux-Arts alumni
French people of Armenian descent
1874 births
1947 deaths
Accademia di Belle Arti di Venezia alumni
20th-century Armenian artists
19th-century French male artists
Armenians from the Ottoman Empire
Emigrants from the Ottoman Empire to France